This article details the Widnes Vikings rugby league football club's 2019 season after their relegation from the Super League at the end of 2018.

Fixtures and results

2019 Championship

References 

Widnes Vikings seasons
Widnes Vikings